Jack Kehoe (November 21, 1934 – January 14, 2020) was an American film actor appearing in a wide variety of films, including the crime dramas Serpico (1973), The Pope of Greenwich Village (1984) and Brian De Palma's The Untouchables (1987), as well as the cult favorites Car Wash (1976) and Midnight Run (1988), the popular western Young Guns II (1990), and On the Nickel (1980).

Kehoe was born in Astoria, New York. After serving in the Air Force, he studied acting under Stella Adler.

On Broadway, Kehoe appeared in The Ballad of the Sad Cafe (1963) and The Basic Training of Pavlo Hummel (1977).

Kehoe appeared in several Academy Award-winning films, including Jonathan Demme's Melvin and Howard (1980) and Best Picture winner The Sting (1973), in which Kehoe (as grifter Joe Erie, alias The Erie Kid). His various TV credits included roles in The Twilight Zone, Murder, She Wrote and Miami Vice.

After appearing alongside Michael Douglas in David Fincher's The Game (1997), Kehoe retired. One of the few interviews he gave during his career was conducted for a 1974 issue of New York Magazine in which Kehoe discussed (among several topics) his outlook on Hollywood.

Kehoe died on January 14, 2020, after a stroke, aged 85. He left behind his partner of 40 years, Sherry Smith. She and Kehoe had no children. He is interred in the Forest Lawn Memorial Park (Hollywood Hills).

Filmography

The Gang That Couldn't Shoot Straight (1971) as Bartender
The Friends of Eddie Coyle (1973) as The Beard
Serpico (1973) as Tom Keough
The Sting (1973) as Erie Kid
Law and Disorder (1974) as Elliott
Car Wash (1976) as Scruggs
The Fish That Saved Pittsburgh (1979) as Setshot
On the Nickel (1980) as Bad Mood
Melvin and Howard (1980) as Jim Delgado
Reds (1981) as Eddie
The Ballad of Gregorio Cortez (1982) as Prosecutor Pierson
The Star Chamber (1983) as Hingle
Two of a Kind (1983) as Mr. Chotiner
The Pope of Greenwich Village (1984) as Bunky
The Wild Life (1984) as Mr. Parker
The Killers (1984) as Harry
Flight of the Spruce Goose (1986) as Freddie Fletcher
The Little Sister (1986) as Nikos
The Untouchables (1987) as Walter Payne
D.O.A. (1988) as Customer at Raid
Midnight Run (1988) as Jerry Geisler
Dick Tracy (1990) as Customer at Raid
Young Guns II (1990) as Ashmun Upson
Servants of Twilight (1991) as Dr. Denton Boothe
Falling Down (1993) as Street Worker
The Paper (1994) as Phil
Gospel According to Harry (1994) as Harry
The Game (1997) as Lieutenant Sullivan (final film role)

References

External links
 
 Jack Kehoe at the University of Wisconsin's Actors Studio audio collection

1934 births
American male film actors
Male actors from California
2020 deaths
American male television actors
20th-century American male actors
American male stage actors
Burials at Forest Lawn Memorial Park (Hollywood Hills)